Cidreira is a municipality in the state of Rio Grande do Sul, Brazil.

References

See also
List of municipalities in Rio Grande do Sul

Populated coastal places in Rio Grande do Sul
Municipalities in Rio Grande do Sul